The Godwhale is a science fiction novel by American novelist T. J. Bass, first published in 1974. It is the sequel to Half Past Human. The book was nominated for the Nebula Award for Best Novel in 1974. The novel deals with genetic and biological inventions with a strange and mystical twist.

The Godwhale presents a view of a far-future Earth in which almost all non-human life has been exterminated due to rampant overpopulation, and most human beings have been transformed into weak, docile, diminutive creatures via genetic engineering and extensive reliance on automation and artificial intelligence. Bass utilizes extensive biochemical and medical terminology in the narrative, and many scenes are quite clinically graphic.

Plot introduction 
The protagonist, Larry Dever, is gravely injured resulting in a radical surgical procedure, a hemicorporectomy, in which tissue below the waist is removed. He is outfitted with a set of intelligent mechanical legs, a "manniquin", and is placed into suspended animation until the damaged tissue can be restored. He wakes at a time when cloning technology can replace his legs, although for a price. Years before he was awakened, a clone, or "bud child", was created and is now a thriving young boy without language. Horrified by the prospect of his child being sacrificed to provide him with a new lower body, Larry opts to return to suspended animation. His child, Dim Dever, is selected by the guiding world computer, called Olga, to carry his ancient genes to a possible new colony on a planet orbiting Procyon.

Larry awakens again in a nightmare future. Far from the highly advanced past, now an enormous human population – 3.5 trillion – covers every inch of the planet in underground shaft cities. Technology and science have degraded, and all freely breeding species have been exterminated except for the five-toed neolithic humans, which are classified as a garden varmint. The 'Hive' or human population of Nebishes – four-toed humans – within its computer-supported subterranean culture ruthlessly hunts, kills, and recycles anyone who consumes their crops, the Benthic Beasts, which are five-toed humans that have formed a precarious niche in abandoned underwater rec domes.

As Larry is trying to adapt to his new life, without most of his own body or his "cyber" torso, accompanied by Big Har, a genetic defect sent for destruction as an infant but managing to escape 'tweenwalls' in the shaft city- something re-awakens an ancient, half-derelict cyborg, the Godwhale of the title. This enormous 'rake' is an ocean-going biota harvester built in part from a genetically modified blue whale. Initially attempting to rejoin human civilization, the Godwhale (named Rorqual Maru or 'Whale Ship' in Japanese), along with its class six companion cyber, Iron Trilobite, eventually teams up with a genetically modified clone of Larry, ARNOLD (Augmented Renal Nucleus of Larry Dever) Larry himself, and an assortment of misfits and refugees from the Hive. Together they set out to try to find out what mysteriously brings the marine biota back to the previously sterile oceans, while a tiny group from the Hive, the outcasts, and their cyber deities survive and thrive in the face of incredible bungling by the 'Class One' computer that manages humanity and the various castes of 'Nebish' humans brought into the fight.

Reception
The Godwhale was a finalist for the Nebula Award for Best Novel in 1974.

Lester del Rey described The Godwhale as "a complex and fascinating novel [and] a fine example of what science fiction is all about." Writing in The New York Times, Theodore Sturgeon simply declared the novel "Good." James Nicoll, conversely, called it "not a good novel", with "characters (who) are thin when they're not implausible", but nonetheless praised it as "a vivid attempt to imagine how a world with trillions of humans might work".

References

1974 American novels
1974 science fiction novels
American biopunk novels
Ballantine Books books
Fiction set around Procyon
Novels about genetic engineering
Overpopulation fiction
Novels about artificial intelligence
Cyborgs in literature
Novels about cloning
Dystopian novels
Fiction about whales
Underwater civilizations in fiction
Underwater novels
Transhumanist books